David Rabin (January 25, 1934 - October 26, 1984) was an endocrinology professor at Vanderbilt University where he researched the possibility of a male contraceptive. Born in Zastron, South Africa as the youngest of four children he was diagnosed with amyotrophic lateral sclerosis (Lou Gehrig's disease) in 1979. Despite his ailments he was able to continue his research with the aid of a computer

Publication 
 Rabin, David; Mckenna, T. Joseph (1982). Clinical endocrinology and metabolism : principles and practice.  New York [u.a.]: Grune & Stratton. .

References

External links
 
 

1934 births
1984 deaths
American endocrinologists
20th-century American physicians